Guardian Media Limited (often referred to as GML) is the media sector of the Trinidadian-based company ANSA McAL. Its headquarters are located at 22-24 St. Vincent Street, Port of Spain, Trinidad and Tobago.

Subsidiaries

Television
 CNC3 (100%) (2005)
 CNC3 Production
 CNC3 Sports
 CNC3 News & Current Affairs

Press
 Trinidad and Tobago Guardian (1917)
 Business Guardian

Radio
 TBC Radio Network (100%) (1947)
 951 Remix
 The Vibe CT 105.1 FM
 Slam 100.5
 Sky 99.5
 Sangeet 106.1 FM
 Freedom 106.5FM
 Mix 90.1FM

Previous
 Radio Trinidad

References

External links 

 
 Ansamcal.com: Guardian Media Limited company profile
 Trinidad Publishing Company
 Trinidad Guardian (newspaper) website
 Ansamcal.com: CNC3 profile
 CNC3 (Television) website
 Trinidad Broadcasting Company profile
 951 Remix Official Website

Mass media companies of Trinidad and Tobago
Mass media companies established in 1917
Publishing companies established in 1917
1910s establishments in Trinidad and Tobago